Penway Industries Ltd. is a privately held garment trading and production company based in Hong Kong. The company is controlled by the Choi and Liu family, and was set up by Lily Liu, who founded the company.

History 

The company was founded in 1984 by Ms. Lily Liu and her former partner Mr. Sze Chung Chi of Perfectex Ltd. Penway's milestone years include 1987 (Opening of the first factory in Xiamen, China),  1989 the opening branch office in Montreal, Canada. 1990 the opening of the second factory in Manila, Philippines. And 1993 the opening of the third factory in Panyu, China.

1995 marked the start of northern China sourcing strategy. 1999 straight out of business management college of current Associate Director and Sales Director Grace Choi. 2008 Penway begin its international digital strategy, and 2009 (beginning of the international design and marketing strategy).

In September 2009, the company launched a major design division for men and women that is carried in the retail and department stores. The company has around 2,200 employees in 3 countries across Asia and the Americas. Including their global sourcing, production location are located in over 30 different major cities in Northern China.

Its products are available in 5000 retail outlets. Revenue is largely derived from casual wear, and jeans wear sales, but also extremely successful and influential ranges of accessories and children's wear.
Production is based mainly in China.

Brands 

The principal lines for Penway Industries Ltd. are Point Zero (China), the main line. A new collaboration is in the works with Blu By Blu (Canada).

Creative direction 
Penway's head designer is Maggie Chew who has worked there since 2009. Maggie started as a designer on the Female, Male, and Kids lines. She is responsible for directing all product design as well as all marketing campaigns, from clothing, accessory design to advertising, digital media, merchandising, retail and interior design, and fashion shows and events.

Awards 

 2008 - Reitmans (Canada) Inc.  - Outstanding Partner and Contributor to Success (1st Pick) 
 2007 - Ningfang Group - Outstanding Partner
 1994 - Reitmans (Canada) Inc. - Outstanding Service and Contributor to Success
 1993 - Fingerhut Companies Inc. - Outstanding Service and Contributor to Success
 1987 - Motherhood Inc. - Outstanding Service and Contributor to Success

External links 
 Penway Industries Ltd. Website

Companies established in 1984
Clothing companies of Hong Kong